Château de Vincennes is a station of the Paris Métro. It is the eastern terminus of line 1 and serves the Château de Vincennes. It lies on the border between the commune of Vincennes and the Bois de Vincennes, which is part of the 12th arrondissement of Paris.


Station layout

Gallery

See also
 List of stations of the Paris Métro

References
Roland, Gérard (2003). Stations de métro. D’Abbesses à Wagram. Éditions Bonneton.

Paris Métro stations in Vincennes
Paris Métro stations in the 12th arrondissement of Paris
Railway stations in France opened in 1934